NAE may refer to:

 National Academy of Engineering, US
 National Association of Evangelicals, a U.S. religious fellowship
 Net acid excretion, the net amount of acid excreted in the urine per unit time
 NEDD8 activating enzyme
 North American English, a generalized variety of the English language

See also
Nae